The  (German, High school of the City of Kerpen) is a  in Kerpen, North Rhine-Westphalia, Germany.

The school was founded in 1968. In 2001, it was certified as a "Europaschule" (de) by the Ministry of Schools of North Rhine-Westphalia.

Facilities 
The school has at its disposal an auditorium, a cafeteria, a refectory, two triple gyms, a library with more than 33,000 books and CD-ROMs, band practice rooms and different school yards.

Bilingual education 
Since the 1995/1996 school year, a bilingual German-English branch is offered. In grades 5 and 6, students who choose the bilingual branch have seven lessons in English a week instead of five. Geography is taught in English from grade 7, politics from grade 8 and history from grade 9.

Sixth form 
In the sixth form (formerly grades 11 to 13, now grades 10 to 12) the curriculum is divided up into “social sciences”, “Mathematics and natural sciences”, “languages” and “other subjects”.

Vocational education foreign language correspondence 
In the sixth form the students can take a vocational education as foreign language correspondent. Students who pass get, in addition to their , a finished apprenticeship/vocational education.

Activities in groups 
A lot of group activities are offered, taking place on Mondays and Wednesdays. The activities on Mondays take place from 2:35 p.m. until 4:05 p.m. and on Wednesdays from 1:50 p.m. until 3:20 p.m. The number of activities on Mondays in the first half-school-year amounted to 16 and on Wednesdays 25. Worth mentioning of these 41 group activities are, for example, the vocational education as sport leader, gliding and the carnival.

Student exchange programs 
The students at the  have the opportunity to take part in student exchange programs. The partner-schools are located in Argentina, Bolivia, China, France, Italy, Nicaragua, Poland, Russia, Spain (Gran Canaria and Tenerife), Sweden, United Kingdom and the United States (Pennsylvania and Texas).

Notes

References

External links 
 Official website of the  

Schools in North Rhine-Westphalia
Gymnasiums in Germany
Buildings and structures in Rhein-Erft-Kreis
Bilingual schools
Educational institutions established in 1968
1968 establishments in West Germany